This is a list of years in Bosnia and Herzegovina. For only articles about years in the country that have been written, see :Category:Years in Bosnia and Herzegovina.

20th century

21st century

See also
List of years by country

 
Bosnia and Herzegovina history-related lists
Bosnia and Herzegovina